Yuriy Viktorovych Shlyakhov (27 May 1983 – 23 July 2019) was a Ukrainian springboard diver. He won a bronze medal for the men's individual springboard at the 2007 Summer Universiade in Bangkok, Thailand.

Career
Shlyakhov made his official debut at the 2004 Summer Olympics in Athens, where he placed twenty-sixth in the men's springboard event, with a total score of 377.19 points.

At the 2008 Summer Olympics in Beijing, Shlyakhov scored a total of 405.15 points, with a spectacular performance in the 3 m individual springboard event. He placed twenty-third out of twenty-nine divers in the preliminary competition, failing to advance into the semi-finals.

References

External links
NBC 2008 Olympics profile

Ukrainian male divers
Olympic divers of Ukraine
Divers at the 2004 Summer Olympics
Divers at the 2008 Summer Olympics
Sportspeople from Dnipro
1983 births
2019 deaths
Universiade medalists in diving
Universiade bronze medalists for Ukraine
Medalists at the 2007 Summer Universiade
Medalists at the 2009 Summer Universiade